The 2006 Saudi Crown Prince Cup Final was the 31st final of the Crown Prince Cup, Saudi Arabia's main football knock-out competition at the time.

It took place on 7 April 2006 at the King Fahd International Stadium in Riyadh, Saudi Arabia, and was contested between Al-Ahli and Al-Hilal. It was Al-Ahli's ninth Crown Prince Cup final and Al-Hilal's seventh final. It was Al-Ahli's first final since 2004 and Al-Hilal's second consecutive final.

Al-Hilal won the game 1–0 to claim their sixth Crown Prince Cup title. As winners of the 2005–06 Saudi Crown Prince Cup, Al-Hilal qualified for the 2007 AFC Champions League group stage.

Teams

Venue

The King Fahd International Stadium was announced as the host of the final venue. This was the seventh Crown Prince Cup final hosted in the King Fahd International Stadium following those in 1992, 1994, 1998, 2003, 2004, and 2005.

The King Fahd International Stadium was built in 1982 and was opened in 1987. The stadium was used as a venue for the 1992, 1995, and the 1997 editions of the FIFA Confederations Cup. Its current capacity is 68,752 and it is used by the Saudi Arabia national football team, Al-Nassr, Al-Shabab, and major domestic matches.

Background
Al-Hilal reached their seventh final after a 5–2 aggregate win against Al-Wehda. This was Al-Hilal's second final in a row. Previously, they won finals in 1964, 1995, 2000, 2003, and 2005, and lost in 1999.

Al-Ahli reached their ninth final, after a 5–4 aggregate win against Al-Shabab. They reached their first final since 2004. They finished as runners-up after losing to Al-Ittihad in that year's final. Previously, they won finals in 1957, 1970, 1998, and 2002, and lost in 1958, 1974, 2003, and 2004.

This was the second meeting between these two sides in the Crown Prince Cup final. Al-Hilal won in 2003. This was the 6th meeting between these two sides in the Crown Prince Cup; previously Al-Hilal won 3 times, Al-Ahli won once and the two teams drew once. The two teams played each other three times in the season prior to the final with Al-Hilal winning all three matches.

Road to the final 

Key: (H) = Home; (A) = Away

Match

Details

{| width="100%"
|valign="top" width="40%"|

See also

2005–06 Saudi Crown Prince Cup
2005–06 Saudi Premier League
2007 AFC Champions League

References

External links

Sports competitions in Saudi Arabia
April 2006 sports events in Asia
Al-Ahli Saudi FC matches
Al Hilal SFC matches